This is a timeline of the history of GB News, a free-to-air television and radio news channel in the United Kingdom.

Timeline

2019
 September – All Perspectives Ltd is founded as the holding company of GB News.

2020
 January – All Perspectives Ltd is granted a licence to broadcast by the media regulator Ofcom.
 25 September – It is announced that Andrew Neil, who has presented live political programmes on the BBC for 25 years, will leave the corporation after leading its coverage of the 2020 United States presidential election. On the same day, he is announced as the presenter of a prime time evening programme on GB News, due to launch early the next year.
 October – Sir Robbie Gibb stands down as an editorial adviser.
 December – Sir Paul Marshall, a hedge-fund manager, is in talks to invest £10 million into GB News.

2021

January 2021
 6 January – GB News reaches its £60 million fundraising aim, which it says is oversubscribed. The majority of the £60 million came from the American multinational Discovery, Inc., the United Arab Emirates-based investment firm Legatum, and Marshall, who says he is investing in a personal capacity. GB News says it will recruit 140 staff, including 120 journalists, and will also launch "streaming, video-on-demand and audio services".
 25 January – The recruitment drive begins.
 28 January – It is announced that Dan Wootton will leave News UK to join the channel as the host of a daily show, five days a week.

February 2021
 8 February – The pressure group Stop Funding Hate calls for advertisers to boycott the channel, based on what it thinks it will represent.
 10 February – Sky News' Colin Brazier is reported to be the host of a news, interview and debate daytime programme.
 18 February – It is announced that Darren McCaffrey will join the channel as political editor and Tom Harwood as a political correspondent.
 19 February – Michelle Dewberry is named as the host of a five-day-a-week prime time show.

March 2021
 2 March – Inaya Folarin Iman, a 24-year-old journalist and former Brexit Party candidate, is announced as another five-day-a-week host.
 5 March – Former Brexit Party Member of the European Parliament Alex Phillips is hired.
 10 March – Following Piers Morgan's departure from Good Morning Britain on 9 March, Neil expresses interest in Morgan joining GB News instead.
 13 March – It is announced that Liam Halligan will join the channel as economics and business editor.
 14 March – In an episode of BBC Radio 4's The Media Show, Neil states that his nightly news programme will contain segments such as "Wokewatch" and "Mediawatch".
 18 March – The channel announces that comedian Andrew Doyle will join it to host a weekly current affairs show.
 23 March – It is announced that Euronews' Rosie Wright will join the channel's breakfast presenting team.
 25 March – It is said that BBC News newsreader Simon McCoy will present an afternoon show.
 29 March – It is announced that broadcaster Kirsty Gallacher will join the breakfast team.

April 2021
 2 April – Former ITV News presenter Alastair Stewart is announced as the host of a weekend news and current affairs programme.
 16 April – Archaeologist Neil Oliver is hired to host a weekly current affairs and interview programme.
 19 April – Former Labour Party Member of Parliament Gloria De Piero is hired to host an afternoon programme.
 23 April – It is announced that Mercy Muroki will co-host a daytime programme tackling everyday issues.

May 2021
 No events.

June 2021
 8 June – Neil says that talks with Piers Morgan were affected by a disagreement: "he's [Morgan] got his own idea of what he is worth and we [GB News] have a slightly different idea of what he's worth".
 11 June – Isabel Webster joins the channel as the co-host of a weekly news review programme.
 13 June –
 GB News commences broadcasting at 20:00 BST. 336,000 viewers tune in to see the launch. The launch soon becomes the subject of ridicule due to the perceived poor production quality of the channel and frequent technical issues.
 Ofcom receives complaints relating to a monologue made on the opening night's edition of Tonight Live with Dan Wootton in which he argues against the government's extension of the COVID-19-related lockdowns in the UK.
 16 June –
 Comments made by guest Lady Colin Campbell seemingly in defence of the deceased child molester Jeffrey Epstein, and his relationship with Prince Andrew – such as saying that criticism of Andrew is "a distraction" to keep Bill Clinton "out of the frame" – draw derision.
 By this day, several brands including Vodafone, IKEA, Kopparbergs Brewery, Grolsch, Nivea, Pinterest, Specsavers and Octopus Energy have paused their advertising on the channel, expressing concerns over its content. Some of these advertisements had been placed on the brands' behalf without their knowledge, by Sky Media through their advertising opt-outs during GB News' schedule.
 19 June – The culture secretary, Oliver Dowden, criticises Stop Funding Hate and what he describes as "a vocal Twitter minority" for calling for the advertising boycott.
 20 June – Nigel Farage and Dehenna Davison join GB News as contributors to host the Sunday morning political discussion programme The Political Correction.
 24 June – Neil takes a break from presenting on the channel, less than two weeks after its launch.

July 2021
 5 July – Ofcom decides not to pursue any of the complaints relating to Dan Wootton's monologue on 13 June, a spokesperson saying, "Our rules allow for rigorous debate around the response to coronavirus... consistent with the right to free expression".
 13 July – Senior executive producer Gill Penlington, formerly of CNN, ITV and Sky News, leaves the channel.
 14 July – Audience figures drop so low they are reported as zero by the ratings measurement board the Broadcasters' Audience Research Board at least twice on the day, attributed to regular viewers boycotting the station after one of its presenters, Guto Harri, took the knee on-air in solidarity with the England football team.
 16 July –
 GB News suspends Guto Harri for taking the knee.
 It is reported by The Guardian that John McAndrew, director of news and programmes, formerly of Sky News and Euronews, had stood down from his role.
 17 July – It is announced that Nigel Farage, already a contributing presenter, will host Farage, a prime-time evening show, from 19 July.
 18 July – Guto Harri confirms he has permanently left the channel.
 19 July –
 It is announced that Mark Dolan will join the channel with Tonight Live with Mark Dolan on 23 July and that Nana Akua will move to a new self-titled programme on Saturday and Sunday afternoons while continuing to host The Great British Breakfast.
 The first episode of Nigel Farage's show airs.

August 2021
 5 August – It is announced that Talkradio's Patrick Christys will join the channel to present To the Point on weekday mornings alongside Mercy Muroki. The programme will replace Brazier & Muroki. This leaves Colin Brazier's sole presenting role as filling in for Neil in the 8 pm slot.
 7 August – After Simon McCoy moves permanently to the breakfast show, McCoy & Phillips is replaced by Alex Phillips' own show, The Afternoon Agenda.
 10 August – The channel announces four political programmes to launch within weeks: The Briefing: AM with Tom Harwood, The Briefing: Lunchtime with Gloria De Piero, The Briefing: PM with Darren McCaffrey, and The Briefing: PMQs.

September 2021
 3 September – The channel announces that political journalist Isabel Oakeshott will host a weekly show.
 13 September – Neil resigns from GB News as chairman and lead presenter and announces he will enter a new role as a guest contributor.
 14 September – Neil is replaced as a presenter by Colin Brazier in what The Telegraph describes as a "fight back by swinging to the right". Brazier is given a permanent programme at 8 pm called Brazier.
 17 September – On the BBC's Question Time, Neil says that he had become a "minority of one" on the channel's board, due to disputes over its approach to journalism.
 22 September – Neil says he will not return to GB News.

October 2021
 Following the launch announcement of rival TalkTV, GB News introduces half-hourly news bulletins and it is reported that Sunday Express editor Mick Booker will join as editorial director.

November 2021
 17 November – Neil calls his decision to lead the channel the "single biggest mistake" of his career, adding "The mistake was that I put my face on the tin and yet I quickly discovered that I really had no say over what was going into that tin".
 26 November – Kirsty Gallacher steps back from her role on The Great British Breakfast because of an ear tumour.

December 2021
 10 December –
 It is announced that Eamonn Holmes and Isabel Webster will present a Monday to Thursday breakfast show, Breakfast with Eamonn and Isabel.
 It is announced that Simon McCoy will leave the channel in January "for personal reasons".
 21 December – It is announced that Stephen Dixon and Anne Diamond will present the breakfast show Friday to Sunday.

2022

January 2022
 Colin Brazier's 8 pm weeknight show is moved to 4 to 6 pm, and the 8 pm Monday to Friday slot is filled by a new show, Steyn, hosted by Mark Steyn.
 We Need to Talk About... hosted by Alex Phillips begins at 2 pm on weekdays targeting women.
 Alastair Stewart's weekend programme begins also airing on Friday afternoons.
 Mick Booker joins as editorial director.
 4 January – GB News Radio, an audio simulcast of the station, becomes available on DAB+ radio. Eamonn Holmes and Isabel Webster are the first to be heard on the simulcast when their television breakfast show starts.
 17 January – GB News announces it will play "God Save the Queen" at the start of live programming every day.
 18 January – The channel begins playing the National Anthem.

February 2022
 No events.

March 2022
 2 March – Company accounts are published for the period ending 31 May 2021 for All Perspectives Ltd, that made a loss of £2.7 million.
 31 March – The first episode of a weekly comedy panel show called The Ministry of Offence is recorded in London.

April 2022
 16 April – The comedy panel show Ministry of Offence makes its debut on GB News.
 25 April – TalkTV, GB News' main news rival, launches. Audience figures for TalkTV's opening night show its ratings outperforming GB News for the debut edition of its flagship show, Piers Morgan Uncensored (aired at 8 pm), but higher figures for GB News for the night as a whole.

May 2022
 18 May – Figures published by RAJAR indicate GB News Radio received an average audience of 239,000 listeners during its first three months on air.

June 2022
 14 June – GB News confirms it will air coverage of the Twelfth of July parade from Belfast after the BBC decided not to broadcast the event. Former Northern Ireland First Minister Dame Arlene Foster will present coverage of the parade.

July 2022
 12 July – GB News airs coverage of the Twelfth of July parade in Northern Ireland. The event, presented by Dame Arlene Foster, the channel's Northern Ireland correspondent Dougie Beattie and former Coronation Street actor Charles Lawson, draws a peak audience of 98,000 viewers.
 28 July – Ofcom is to launch an investigation into GB News after presenter Mark Steyn made misleading claims about COVID-19 booster vaccines on the 21 April edition of his show. Steyn had alleged that British people were being killed by having the booster and that there was a media silence on the issue.
 31 July – The Telegraph reports that TalkTV and GB News are in a bidding war to secure Channel 604 on Virgin Media. The news channels currently occupy channels 626 and 627, but a move would increase their profile by putting them next to larger rivals such as BBC News and Sky News.

August 2022
 4 August – The latest RAJAR figures are published, covering radio listening in the United Kingdom during the second quarter of 2022. They show a percentage increase in listeners for both Talkradio and GB News, with the audience increase at 6% and 16% respectively when compared with the previous quarter.
 8 August –
 The Telegraph reports that GB News have beaten TalkTV to secure a channel move on Virgin Media to Channel 604, giving it a higher news channel ranking, and placing it between Sky News and BBC Parliament.
 An Ofcom investigation clears Nigel Farage's "Talking Pints" segment of breaching standards following an interview on 23 August 2021 that featured darts player Bobby George using what was described as "offensive language". The decision means GB News remains clear of any reprimands from Ofcom since its launch.
 10 August – GB News airs The People's Forum with Liz Truss from Leigh, Greater Manchester, with Conservative leadership candidate Liz Truss answering questions from an audience.
 11 August – Rachel Sweeney announces she is leaving her role as GB News' North East correspondent.
 18 August –
 It is reported that GB News has secured £60 million of new investment, having approached investor Sir Paul Marshall for further funding. American multinational Warner Bros. Discovery announces its intention to sell its stake in GB News. GB News announces that co-founders Andrew Cole and Mark Schneider have resigned as directors and sold their stakes in the business.
 It is reported that The Telegraph journalist Camilla Tominey will become a political presenter on the channel and that the Daily Mails Andrew Pierce will launch his own show later in the year. It is also reported that Michael Portillo will be supporting GB News' political coverage and presenting a new programme in the autumn.
 19 August – GB News airs a two-hour Conservative leadership hustings from Manchester featuring the two candidates, Liz Truss and Rishi Sunak, and hosted by GB News presenter Alastair Stewart.
 28 August – GB News attracts criticism from Jewish community groups after Peter Imanuelsen, a journalist and alleged Holocaust denier, appeared on the previous evening's edition of Neil Oliver's programme to talk about population decline in the UK. Imanuelsen rejects claims of denying the Holocaust, blaming "fake, photoshopped screenshots" created by those attempting to "smear" him.
 31 August − GB News performs a shakeup of its daytime schedule which will take effect from the first week in September, giving Gloria de Piero and Philip Davies and Esther McVey new shows, while Alexandra Phillips and Colin Brazier are axed from the channel.

September 2022
 7 September – GB News appoints Nicole O'Shea as commercial director, responsible for advertising on the channel.
 8 September – GB News suspends advertising following news of the death of Queen Elizabeth II.
 19 September – The channel covers Queen Elizabeth II's state funeral, and is one of a number of British television channels to take pooled footage of the funeral proceedings from the BBC.
 21 September – Helen Warner, chief creative officer at broadcast production company Whisper and former head of daytime at ITV and Channel 4, is appointed GB News head of television as the channel seeks to expand its programme content.

October 2022
2 October – 
 The Sunday Times reports that the value of GB News has more than halved since Discovery sold its stake in the news channel.
 Michael Portillo's new show, called Portillo, launches, covering politics and the arts.
6 October – It is reported that GB News has appointed Reach plc executive Geoff Marsh as its chief digital officer.
10 October – Actor John Cleese confirms he will present a programme for GB News from 2023, where he will work alongside Andrew Doyle.
14 October – Ofcom announces an investigation into GB News over its coverage of matters relating to COVID-19 vaccination following an interview with the author Naomi Wolf that aired on 4 October, and during which she claimed women were being harmed by COVID-19 vaccines as part of an effort "to destroy British civil society", while likening the behaviour of the medical profession to that of Nazi Germany. Ofcom's investigation will cover whether the interview broke "rules designed to protect viewers from harmful material", and is the second such investigation into the news channel.

November 2022
 7 November – Ofcom finds GB News Radio in breach of the broadcasting code Rule 6.0 for not providing notification of all parties and candidates standing in the 2022 Birmingham Erdington by-election during an on air discussion on 2 March. While the channel did show onscreen details of the candidates during the To the Point debate on 2 March, the same information was not provided for its radio simulcast.

December 2022
 21 December – News company The News Movement confirms that Becca Hutson, GB News' former head of digital who left the channel in October, is joining to become its UK head of news.

2023

January 2023
9 January – It is reported that GB News has hired comedian Dapper Laughs as a commentator on its late night newspaper review show, Headliners.
13 January – It is reported that former GB News presenter Mercy Muroki has been hired by the UK government to advise Kemi Badenoch, the Minister for Women and Equalities, on gender policy.
17 January – GB News head of television Helen Warner leaves her post after four months with the channel.
26 January – GB News announces it has hired Conservative MP and former Business Secretary Jacob Rees-Mogg to present a show.

February 2023
 6 February – Mark Steyn, who used his GB News show to cast doubt on the safety of COVID-19 vaccines, quits the channel after claiming its bosses tried to make him pay fines issued by Ofcom following two investigations into his programme.
 8 February – The Board of Deputies of British Jews and the All-Party Parliamentary Group Against Antisemitism urge the media regulator Ofcom and GB News to tackle what it describes as the channel's indulgence in conspiracy theories. The comments follow the 4 February edition of Neil Oliver's programme in which he described a "silent war" by generations of politicians to take "total control of the people" by creating a "one-world government".
 21 February – The Telegraph journalist Christopher Hope announces he is joining GB News as head of politics and political editor later in the year.
 28 February – Intelligence tool Foresight News appoints GB News deputy news editor Jamie Micklethwaite as its deputy editor.

March 2023
 5 March – It is announced that Dame Arlene Foster will expand her role at GB News, taking on further presenting duties alongside making documentaries for the channel. Her first documentary, looking at the role of faith in politics, is to come out later in the year.
 6 March – 
 GB News confirms it will air coverage of the Twelfth of July parade from Belfast for the second year running. Foster will again present coverage of the parade.
 Ofcom says that GB News broke broadcasting rules in April 2022 when Mark Steyn made "potentially harmful and materially misleading" claims about COVID-19 vaccines.
 7 March – GB News announces that Conservative MP Lee Anderson is to host a show on the channel.
 9 March – GB News reports a loss of £30 million for its first year on air, from June 2021 to June 2022. It also had a turnover of £3.6 million over the same period.
 11 March – GB News airs The Alternative Match of the Day, hosted by Mark Dolan and Patrick Christys, following the BBC's announcement that Gary Lineker would be taking a "step back" from presenting Match of the Day after Lineker's criticism of the UK's asylum policy via Twitter. The programme does not show any actual football coverage, and is panned on social media by viewers who believed it to be a parody.

References

GB News
GB News
GB News
GB News
GB News
GB News
2020s in British television